The Serres de l'Université de Bourgogne are greenhouse botanical gardens operated by the University of Burgundy. They are located at 8 rue du Recteur Marcel Bouchard, Dijon, Bourgogne, Côte-d'Or, France.

The greenhouses were established in 1966 and consist of a palm house, laboratories, and six greenhouses designated for hot, temperate, and cold climates, cactuses, experiments, and multiple purposes. They preserve various threatened plants of Bourgogne, and also contain a range of tropical and subtropical genera such as Psilotum and Lycopodium, tropical aquatics such as Eichhornia and Salvinia, carnivorous plants including Sarracenia and Darlingtonia, and epiphytes including Bromeliaceae and Orchidaceae. Collections also include a herbarium (5,000 specimens of historic interest) and teaching models of plants.

See also 
 List of botanical gardens in France

References 
 Serres de l'Université de Bourgogne
 Convention on Biological Diversity: Botanical Gardens in France

Bourgogne, Serres de l'Universite de
Bourgogne, Serres de l'Universite de
Buildings and structures in Côte-d'Or
University of Burgundy
Tourist attractions in Dijon